Isodemis illiberalis is a moth of the family Tortricidae. It is known from China (Guangdong, Guangxi, Yunnan), Vietnam, Thailand, India and Nepal.

The wingspan is 16–19.5 mm.

External links

Review of the genus Isodemis Diakonoff (Lepidoptera, Tortricidae) from China, with description of three new species

Archipini